The 2021 BYU Cougars softball team represents Brigham Young University in the 2021 NCAA Division I softball season.  Gordon Eakin enters the year as head coach of the Cougars for a 19th consecutive season. 2021 is the eighth season for the Cougars as members of the WCC in softball. The Cougars entered 2021 having won their last 11 conference championships, though they never made it to conference play in 2020 due to the COVID-19 pandemic.

2021 Roster

Schedule 

|-
!colspan=10 style="background:#002654; color:#FFFFFF;"| Kajakawa Classic

 
|-
!colspan=10 style="background:#002654; color:#FFFFFF;"| St. George Classic

|-
!colspan=10 style="background:#002654; color:#FFFFFF;"| Arizona Tournament

|-
!colspan=10 style="background:#002654; color:#FFFFFF;"| DeMarani Invitational

|-
!colspan=10 style="background:#002654; color:#FFFFFF;"| Regular Season

|-
!colspan=10 style="background:#002654; color:#FFFFFF;"| UCCU Crosstown Clash

|-
!colspan=10 style="background:#002654; color:#FFFFFF;"| Regular Season

|-
!colspan=10 style="background:#002654; color:#FFFFFF;"| Deseret First Duel

|-
!colspan=10 style="background:#002654; color:#FFFFFF;"| Regular Season

|-
!colspan=10 style="background:#002654; color:#FFFFFF;"| UCCU Crosstown Clash

|-
!colspan=10 style="background:#002654; color:#FFFFFF;"| Regular Season

|-
!colspan=10 style="background:#002654; color:#FFFFFF;"| 2021 NCAA Division I softball tournament

TV and Streaming Broadcast Information
Arizona State: Matt Venezia & Mac Friday (P12+ ASU)
Arizona State: Ben Pokorny & Mac Friday (P12+ ASU)
Washington: No commentary (YouTube)
Seattle: No commentary (FloSoftball)
Arizona: Danny Martinez (P12+ ARIZ)
Oregon State: No commentary (P12+ ARIZ)
Arizona: Danny Martinez (P12+ ARIZ)
Stanford: Joaquin Wallace (P12+ STAN)
Stanford: Jenna Becerra (P12+ STAN)
Texas: Tyler Denning & Erin Miller (LHN)
Tarleton State: Tyler Denning & Erin Miller (LHN)
Stanford: Spencer Linton & Gary Sheide (BYUtv.org)
Boise State DH: Jarom Jordan & Gary Sheide (BYUtv.org)
Southern Utah: Jarom Jordan & Spencer Linton (BYUtv)
Baylor: Spencer Linton & Caitlyn Alldredge (BYUtv.org)
Baylor DH: Spencer Linton & Caitlyn Alldredge (BYUtv.org)
Utah State: Spencer Linton & Caitlyn Alldredge (BYUtv.org) 
Saint Mary's: No commentary (WCC Net)
Saint Mary's DH: No commentary (WCC Net)
Idaho State: Jarom Jordan  & Caitlyn Alldredge (BYUtv.org) 
Utah Valley: Spencer Linton & Caitlyn Alldredge (BYUtv.org) 
Southern Utah: Spencer Linton & Caitlyn Alldredge (BYUtv.org) 
Utah: Spencer Linton & Caitlyn Alldredge (BYUtv.org)
San Diego DH: Spencer Linton & Caitlyn Alldredge (BYUtv.org)
San Diego: Spencer Linton & Caitlyn Alldredge (BYUtv.org)
Utah Valley: Ryan Pickens & Josh Kallunki (WAC DN)
Loyola Marymount: No commentary (YouTube)
Loyola Marymount DH: No commentary (YouTube)
Southern Utah: Kylee Young (Pluto TV)
Santa Clara DH: No commentary (YouTube)
Santa Clara: No commentary (YouTube)
Dixie State DH: Spencer Linton & Caitlyn Alldredge (BYUtv.org)
Utah State: Adam Larson & Aaron (MW Net)
Virginia Tech: John Schriffen & Jennie Ritter (ESPN3)
Southern Illinois: John Schriffen & Jennie Ritter (ESPN3)
Arizona State: John Schriffen & Jennie Ritter (ESPN3)
Virginia Tech: John Schriffen & Jennie Ritter (ACCN)

See also 
2020 BYU Cougars football team
2020–21 BYU Cougars men's basketball team
2020–21 BYU Cougars women's basketball team
2020–21 BYU Cougars women's soccer team
2020–21 BYU Cougars women's volleyball team
2021 BYU Cougars men's volleyball team
2021 BYU Cougars baseball team

External links 
 BYU Softball at byucougars.com

References 

2021 team
2021 in sports in Utah